Historically, there have been multiple claims and theories conceived that concern the origin of the Pashtun people, who are classified as an Iranic ethnic group native to Central and South Asia.

The most prominent theories of Pashtun origin are:

 Descent from the Pakthas, an ancient people referenced in Sanskrit and Greek sources who inhabited what is today southeastern Afghanistan and western Pakistan.
 Descent from the Saka, a group of nomadic Iranic peoples who historically inhabited the Eurasian Steppe and the Tarim Basin. 
 Descent from the Hephthalites (also known as the White Huns), a late-antiquity nomadic confederation in Central Asia.
 The traditional legend of descent from the Ten Lost Tribes of the ancient Israelites through Saul, the first king of Israel. 

Prior to DNA studies, it was generally acknowledged that their origins were obscure. The early precursors to modern-day Pashtuns may have been old Iranian tribes that spread throughout the eastern Iranian plateau. Modern scholars suggest that a common and singular origin between the Pashtun tribes is unlikely due to their existence as a tribal confederation.

Connection with ancient Vedic tribe Pakthas
Historians have come across several references to various ancient peoples called Pakthas (Pactyans) between the 2nd and the 1st millennium BC, who may be their early ancestors.

There is mention of the tribe called Pakthās  who were one of the Vedic tribes that fought against Sudas in the Dasarajna the Battle of the Ten Kings (dāśarājñá), a battle alluded to in Mandala 7 of the Rigveda (RV 7.18.7). dated between c. 1500 and 1200 BCE.  The Pakthās are mentioned:

Heinrich Zimmer connects them with a tribe mentioned by Herodotus (Pactyans) in 430 BCE in the Histories:

Heinrich Zimmer connects them with a tribe mentioned by Herodotus (Pactyans) in 430 BCE in the Histories:

These Pactyans lived on the eastern frontier of the Achaemenid Arachosia Satrapy as early as the 1st millennium BCE. Herodotus also mentions a tribe of known as Aparytai (Ἀπαρύται). Thomas Holdich has linked them with the Afridi tribe:

Joseph Marquart made the connection of the Pashtuns with names such as the Parsiētai (Παρσιῆται), Parsioi (Πάρσιοι) that were cited by Ptolemy 150 CE:

Strabo, the Greek geographer, in the Geographica (written between 43 BC to 23 AD) makes mention of the Scythian tribe Pasiani (Πασιανοί), which has also been identified with Pashtuns given that Pashto is an Eastern-Iranian language, much like the Scythian languages:

This is considered a different rendering of Ptolemy's Parsioi (Πάρσιοι). Johnny Cheung, reflecting on Ptolemy's Parsioi (Πάρσιοι) and Strabo's Pasiani (Πασιανοί) states: "Both forms show slight phonetic substitutions, viz. of υ for ι, and the loss of r in Pasianoi is due to perseveration from the preceding Asianoi. They are therefore the most likely candidates as the (linguistic) ancestors of modern day Pashtuns."

Saka origin 

Pashto is generally classified as an Eastern Iranian language. It shares features with the Munji language, which is the closest existing language to the extinct Bactrian, but also shares features with the Sogdian language, as well as Khwarezmian, Shughni, Sanglechi, and Khotanese Saka. 

It is suggested by some that Pashto may have originated in the Badakhshan region and is connected to a Saka language akin to Khotanese. In fact major linguist Georg Morgenstierne has described Pashto as a Saka dialect and many others have observed the similarities between Pashto and other Saka languages as well, suggesting that the original Pashto speakers might have been a Saka group. Furthemore Pashto and Ossetian, another Scythian-descending language, share cognates in their vocabulary which other Eastern Iranian languages lack Cheung suggests a common isogloss between Pashto and Ossetian which he explains by an undocumented Saka dialect being spoken close to reconstructed Old Pashto which was likely spoken north of the Oxus at that time. Others however have suggested a much older Iranic ancestor given the affinity to Old Avestan.

Hephthalite (White Hun) descent
Yu. V. Gankovsky, a Soviet historian proposes an Ephthalite origin for Pashtuns. 

According to Georg Morgenstierne, the Durrani tribe who were known as the "Abdali" before the formation of the Durrani Empire 1747, might be connected to with the Hephthalites; Aydogdy Kurbanov endorses this view who proposes that after the collapse of the Hephthalite confederacy, Hephthalite likely assimilated into different local populations.

Others draw different conclusions. Ghilji tribe has been connected to the Khalaj people. Following al-Khwarizmi, Josef Markwart claimed the Khalaj to be remnants of the Hephthalite confederacy. The Hephthalites may have been Indo-Iranian, although the view that they were of Turkic Gaoju origin "seems to be most prominent at present". The Khalaj may originally have been Turkic-speaking and only federated with Iranian Pashto-speaking tribes in Medieval times.

However, according to linguist Sims-Williams, archaeological documents do not support the suggestion that the Khalaj were the successors of the Hephthalites, while according to historian V. Minorsky, the Khalaj were "perhaps only politically associated with the Hephthalites."

Bani Israel theory
Some anthropologists lend credence to the oral traditions of the Pashtun tribes themselves. For example, according to the Encyclopaedia of Islam, the theory of Pashtun descent from Israelites is traced to Nimat Allah al-Harawi, who compiled a history for Khan-e-Jehan Lodhi in the reign of Mughal Emperor Jehangir in the 17th century. The 13th century Tabaqat-i Nasiri discusses the settlement of immigrant Bani Israel at the end of the 8th century CE in the Ghor region of Afghanistan, settlement attested by Jewish inscriptions in Ghor. Historian André Wink suggests that the story "may contain a clue to the remarkable theory of the Jewish origin of some of the Afghan tribes which is persistently advocated in the Persian-Afghan chronicles." These references to Bani Israel agree with the commonly held view by Pashtuns that when the twelve tribes of Israel were dispersed, the tribe of Joseph, among other Hebrew tribes, settled in the Afghanistan region. This oral tradition is widespread among the Pashtun tribes. There have been many legends over the centuries of descent from the Ten Lost Tribes after groups converted to Christianity and Islam. Hence the tribal name Yusufzai in Pashto translates to the "son of Joseph". A similar story is told by many historians, including the 14th century Ibn Battuta and 16th century Ferishta. However, the similarity of names can also be traced to the presence of Arabic through Islam.

One conflicting issue in the belief that the Pashtuns descend from the Israelites is that the Ten Lost Tribes were exiled by the ruler of Assyria, while Maghzan-e-Afghani says they were permitted by the ruler to go east to Afghanistan. This inconsistency can be explained by the fact that Persia acquired the lands of the ancient Assyrian Empire when it conquered the Empire of the Medes and Chaldean Babylonia, which had conquered Assyria decades earlier. But no ancient author mentions such a transfer of Israelites further east, or no ancient extra-Biblical texts refer to the Ten Lost Tribes at all.

Some Afghan historians have maintained that Pashtuns are linked to the ancient Israelites. Mohan Lal quoted Mountstuart Elphinstone who wrote:

This theory has been criticised by not being substantiated by historical evidence. Dr. Zaman Stanizai criticises this theory:

According to genetic studies Pashtuns have a greater R1a1a*-M198 modal halogroup than Jews:

Other theories of descent 
Some Pashtun tribes claim descent from Arabs, including some claiming to be Sayyids (descendants of Muhammad). Some groups from Peshawar and Kandahar believe to be descended from Greeks who arrived with Alexander the Great. According to Firasat et al. 2007, only a small proportion of Pashtuns may descend from Greeks, but they also suggest that Greek ancestry may also have come from Greek slaves brought by Xerxes I.

One historical account connects the Pashtuns to a possible Ancient Egyptian past but this lacks supporting evidence.

Henry Walter Bellew (1864) was of the view that the Pashtuns likely have mixed Greek and Rajput roots. Following Alexander's brief occupation, the successor state of the Seleucid Empire expanded influence on the Pashtuns until 305 BCE when they gave up dominating power to the Indian Maurya Empire as part of an alliance treaty.

See also 
 Genetics and archaeogenetics of Pashtuns
 Dashti Yahudi
 Nimat Allah al-Harawi  Author of Tarikh-i-Khan Jahani Makhzan-i-Afghani
 Bani Israel
 British Israelism
 Japanese-Jewish common ancestry theory
 Theory of Kashmiri descent from lost tribes of Israel
 Qais Abdur Rashid

Notes

References

External links
Alden Oreck, The Virtual Jewish History Tour: Afghanistan from Jewish Virtual Library
Bani-Israelite Theory of Paktoons Ethnic Origin on the site of World Afghan Jirgah. Archived 6 February 2005.
Traditions of Israelite Descent Among Certain Muslim Groups in South Asia
From the most of ages by Shahid Hassan From the Mists of Ages

Pashtun
Pashtun
Jews and Judaism in Pakistan
Pashtun people